Shenzong is the temple name used for several emperors of China. It may refer to:

Emperor Shenzong of Song (1048–1085, reigned 1067–1085), emperor of the Song dynasty
Emperor Shenzong of Western Xia (1163–1223, reigned 1211–1223), emperor of Western Xia
Wanli Emperor (1563–1620, reigned 1572–1620), emperor of the Ming dynasty

Other Usages
ShenZong is sometimes used to refer to the currently under construction Shenzhen–Zhongshan Bridge.

See also
Thần Tông (disambiguation), Vietnamese equivalent

Temple name disambiguation pages